Jemimah Jessica Rodrigues (born 5 September 2000) is an Indian cricketer. She is an allrounder on the Mumbai women's cricket team and was in the Under-17 Maharashtra hockey team.

In June 2018, she was awarded with the Jagmohan Dalmiya Award presented by cricketer MS Dhoni for Best Domestic Junior Women's Cricketer by the Board of Control for Cricket in India (BCCI) at Jharkhand.

Early life 
Jemimah Rodrigues was born and brought-up in Bhandup, Mumbai, India along with her two brothers, Enoch and Eli. She is a practising Christian. At the age of four years, she started playing season cricket. They moved to another corner of the city that is at Bandra West at a very young age to avail of better sports facilities. Her father, Ivan Rodrigues, was a junior coach in her school and she grew up bowling to her brothers.
Jemimah's father, Ivan, who has been coaching her since the very beginning, started the girls’ cricket team at her school. Jemimah enjoyed playing both hockey and cricket as a youth.

Jemimah Rodrigues studied in St. Joseph's Convent High School, Mumbai and later in Rizvi College of Arts, Science & Commerce.

Career 

Jemimah Rodrigues was selected for the Maharashtra under-17 and under-19 hockey teams. Her cricket U-19 debut was at the age of 12-and-a-half, during the 2012-13 cricket season. She was picked when only 13 for the under-19 state cricket team.

Jemimah says that her father is her primary coach and her "Hero" and she owe all the success to him. Rodrigues is the second woman after Smriti Mandhana to score a double century in a 50 over cricket match. She scored 202* in just 163 balls in Aurangabad against Saurashtra team in November 2017. This score included 21 boundaries. Just before this match, she also scored 178 off 142 balls against Gujarat team in the under-19 tournament.

She was named in the Indian squad for the three-match ODI series against South Africa to be played in February 2018. She made her Women's Twenty20 International cricket (WT20I) debut for India Women against South Africa Women on 13 February 2018. She made her Women's One Day International cricket (WODI) debut for India Women against Australia Women on 12 March 2018.

In October 2018, she was named in India's squad for the 2018 ICC Women's World Twenty20 tournament in the West Indies. Ahead of the tournament, she was named as the player to watch in the team. Following the conclusion of the tournament, she was named as the standout player in the team by the International Cricket Council (ICC).

In October 2018, looking at her striking achievements, Rodrigues was signed by a Sports Marketing firm Baseline Ventures, having to manage all her commercial interests. On 1 March 2019, she attended a ceremony of the Indian cricket Team's New Jersey launch for the ICC 2019 World Cup, where other cricketers including Harmanpreet Kaur, MS Dhoni, Virat Kohli, Ajinkya Rahane, and Prithvi Shaw were also present. In January 2020, she was named in India's squad for the 2020 ICC Women's T20 World Cup in Australia.

In May 2021, she was named in India's Test squad for their one-off match against the England women's cricket team. In the summer of 2021, Rodrigues competed in the inaugural Hundred competition for the Northern Superchargers. She excelled with the bat, averaging 41.50 and also posting the highest score of the women's Hundred with 92* against Welsh Fire. She was the second-highest run-scorer in the women's Hundred tournament with 249 runs. In August 2021, Rodrigues was also named in India's Test squad for their series against Australia.

She also plays for Melbourne Renegades in the 2021 WBBL. In February 2022, she was retained by Northern Superchargers for the 2022 edition of the Hundred.

In July 2022, she was named in India's team for the cricket tournament at the 2022 Commonwealth Games in Birmingham, England.

In the inaugral edition of Women's Premier League 2023 she was sold to Delhi Capitals for  Rs 2.20 Crore. She made an impressive debut in her WPL 2023 debut match scoring 22 runs of just 15 balls againt Royal Challengers Bangalore.

References

External links

 
 

2000 births
Living people
Cricketers from Mumbai
Indian women cricketers
Mumbai women cricketers
Sportswomen from Maharashtra
West Zone women cricketers
Yorkshire Diamonds cricketers
India women Twenty20 International cricketers
India women One Day International cricketers
IPL Trailblazers cricketers
IPL Supernovas cricketers
Delhi Capitals (WPL) cricketers
Northern Superchargers cricketers
Melbourne Renegades (WBBL) cricketers
Melbourne Stars (WBBL) cricketers
Cricketers at the 2022 Commonwealth Games
Commonwealth Games silver medallists for India
Commonwealth Games medallists in cricket
Medallists at the 2022 Commonwealth Games